Pliocrocuta is an extinct genus of terrestrial carnivore in the family Hyaenidae.

See also
 Pachycrocuta

References

Miocene feliforms
Miocene genus extinctions
Miocene mammals of Europe
Prehistoric carnivoran genera
Prehistoric hyenas